Phra Brahmapundit (born 17 September 1955) is a Buddhist Chief Abbot of Wat Prayurawongsawat in Bangkok, and a member of the Supreme Sangha Council. He also serves as Rector of Mahachulalongkornrajavidyalaya University (MCU) in Thailand, and is the Ecclesiastical Governor of Region II. He is interested in interfaith dialogue and currently sits on the Board of World Religious Leaders for the Elijah Interfaith Institute.

References

External links
 http://www.buddhistelibrary.org/library/profile.php?aapath=143
 http://www.vesakday.net/vesak50/biography.php?trnslang=th&wh_id=8

Thai Theravada Buddhist monks
Living people
Thai Buddhists
1955 births
People from Suphan Buri province